Ustersbach is a municipality  in the district of Augsburg in Bavaria in Germany. It is situated  approx.  west of Augsburg

History
The village was probably founded in the 11th century and was first mentioned in 1277.  It has been part of Bavaria since 1803.

Main sights
The most important monument in Ustersbach is a marble stone dating back to the late Middle Ages commemorating the murder of a knight in 1408.

Commerce and infrastructure

Transport
Ustersbach is located on the Bundesstraße 300 linking it to Augsburg. The Ulm–Augsburg railway line also crosses the territory of Ustersbach.

Economy
The main industry of Ustersbach is a brewery producing beer and soft drinks labeled 'Ustersbacher Bier'.

Politics

Distribution of places on the 12-seat municipality-council (as of municipal elections in 2008) is as follows:
 CSU/FW: 8 seats
 Freie Wählergemeinschaft (citizens' coalition): 4 seats

Notable citizens
After the bombing of Munich in World War II the German writer, translator and cultural critic Theodor Haecker fled to Ustersbach. Theodor Haecker had connections with the German resistance, particularly the White Rose. He died in April 1945 and is buried in Ustersbach.

Culture

Religion
Saint Fridolin of Säckingen is the patron saint of the Roman Catholic parish church of Ustersbach.

Sport
The local sport club is named TSV Ustersbach. Although its name is referring to sports and gymnastics in general, its most important section is football.

References

Augsburg (district)